The Six Million Dollar Man is an American science fiction and action television series, running from 1973 to 1978, about a former astronaut, USAF Colonel Steve Austin, portrayed by Lee Majors. After a NASA test flight accident, Austin is rebuilt with superhuman strength, speed and vision due to bionic implants and is employed as a secret agent by a fictional U.S. government office titled OSI. The series was based on Martin Caidin's 1972 novel Cyborg, which was the working title of the series during pre-production.

Following three television films intended as pilots, which all aired in 1973, The Six Million Dollar Man television series aired on the ABC network as a regular episodic series for five seasons from 1974 to 1978. Steve Austin became a pop culture icon of the 1970s.

A spin-off television series, The Bionic Woman, featuring the lead female character Jaime Sommers, ran from 1976 to 1978. Three television movies featuring both bionic characters were also produced from 1987 to 1994.

Plot

Original series
When NASA astronaut USAF Colonel Steve Austin is severely injured in the crash of an experimental lifting body aircraft, he is "rebuilt" in an operation that costs $6 million (equivalent to $ million in ). He uses his enhanced abilities to work for the OSI (Office of Scientific Intelligence) as a secret agent.

Caidin's novel Cyborg was a best-seller when it was published in 1972. He followed it up with three sequels, Operation Nuke, High Crystal, and Cyborg IV, respectively about a black market in nuclear weapons, a Chariots of the Gods? scenario, and fusing Austin's bionic hardware to a spaceplane.

In March 1973, Cyborg was loosely adapted as a made-for-TV movie titled The Six Million Dollar Man starring Majors as Austin. The producers' first choice was Monte Markham. (When re-edited for the later series, it was re-titled "The Moon and the Desert, Parts I and II".) The adaptation was done by writer Howard Rodman, working under the pseudonym of Henri Simoun. The film, which was nominated for a Hugo Award, modified Caidin's plot and notably made Austin a civilian astronaut rather than a colonel in the United States Air Force. Absent were some of the standard features of the later series: the electronic sound effects, the slow-motion running, and the character of Oscar Goldman. Instead, another character named Oliver Spencer, played by Darren McGavin, was Austin's supervisor, of an organization here called the Office of Strategic Operations, or "OSO". (In the novels, "OSO" stood for Office of Special Operations. The CIA did have an Office of Scientific Intelligence in the 1970s.) The lead scientist involved in implanting Austin's bionic hardware, Rudy Wells, was played in the pilot by Martin Balsam, then on an occasional basis in the series by Alan Oppenheimer, and, finally, as a series regular, by Martin E. Brooks. Austin did not use the enhanced capabilities of his bionic eye during the first TV movie.

The first movie was a major ratings success and was followed by two more made-for-TV movies in October and November 1973 as part of ABC's rotating Movie of the Week series. The first was titled The Six Million Dollar Man: "Wine, Women and War", and the second was titled The Six Million Dollar Man: "The Solid Gold Kidnapping". The first of these two bore strong resemblances to Caidin's second Cyborg novel, Operation Nuke; the second, however, was an original story. This was followed in January 1974 by the debut of The Six Million Dollar Man as a weekly hour-long series. The latter two movies, produced by Glen A. Larson, notably introduced a James Bond flavor to the series and reinstated Austin's status from the novels as an Air Force colonel; the hour-long series, produced by Harve Bennett, dispensed with the James Bond-gloss of the movies, and portrayed a more down-to-earth Austin. (Majors said of Austin, "[He] hates...the whole idea of spying. He finds it repugnant, degrading. If he's a James Bond, he's the most reluctant one we've ever had.")

The show was very popular during its run and introduced several pop culture elements of the 1970s, such as the show's opening catchphrase ("We can rebuild him; we have the technology", voiced over by Richard Anderson in his role of Oscar Goldman), the slow motion action sequences, and the accompanying "electronic" sound effects. The slow motion action sequences were originally referred to as "Kung Fu slow motion" in popular culture (due to its use in the 1970s martial arts television series), although according to The Bionic Book by Herbie J. Pilato, the use of slow motion on the series was inspired by its use by NFL Films.

In 1975, a two-part episode titled "The Bionic Woman", written for television by Kenneth Johnson, introduced the lead character Jaime Sommers (played by Lindsay Wagner), a professional tennis player who rekindled an old romance with Austin, only to experience a parachuting accident that resulted in her being given bionic parts similar to Austin. Ultimately, her body "rejected" her bionic hardware and she died. The character was very popular, however, and the following season it was revealed that she had survived, having been saved by an experimental cryogenic procedure, and she was given her own spin-off series, The Bionic Woman.  This spin-off ran until 1978 when both it and The Six Million Dollar Man were simultaneously cancelled, though the two series were on different networks when their final seasons aired.

Television movie reunions
Steve Austin and Jaime Sommers returned in three subsequent made-for-television movies: The Return of the Six Million Dollar Man and the Bionic Woman (1987), Bionic Showdown: The Six Million Dollar Man and the Bionic Woman (1989) which featured Sandra Bullock in an early role as a new bionic woman; and Bionic Ever After? (1994) in which Austin and Sommers finally marry. Majors reprised the role of Steve Austin in all three productions, which also featured Richard Anderson and Martin E. Brooks, and Lindsay Wagner reprising the role of Jaime Sommers. The reunion films addressed the partial amnesia Sommers had suffered during the original series, and all three featured Majors' son, Lee Majors II, as OSI agent Jim Castillian. The first two movies were written in the anticipation of creating new bionic characters in their own series, but nothing further was seen of the new characters introduced in those produced. The third TV movie was intended as a finale.

Cast

 Steve Austin (played by Lee Majors), the lead character
 Oscar Goldman (played by Richard Anderson), Director of the OSI
 Rudy Wells (played by Martin Balsam, 1st pilot episode; Alan Oppenheimer, 2nd and 3rd pilot episodes, seasons 1 & 2 and 1 episode in season 3; Martin E. Brooks, seasons 3–5, as well as on The Bionic Woman and in three movies), Austin's physician and primary overseer of the medical aspects of bionic technology
 Jaime Sommers (played by Lindsay Wagner—recurring)
 Peggy Callahan (played by Jennifer Darling—recurring), secretary to Oscar Goldman
 Oliver Spencer (played by Darren McGavin), director of the OSO in the pilot

Production

Opening sequence
The crash footage during the opening credits is from the M2-F2 crash that occurred on May 10, 1967. In the episode "The Deadly Replay", Oscar Goldman refers to the lifting body aircraft in which Austin crashed as the HL-10, stating "We've rebuilt the HL-10." The HL-10 is the aircraft first seen in the original pilot movie before the accident flight. In the 1987 TV film The Return of the Six Million Dollar Man and the Bionic Woman, Austin refers to the craft as the "M3-F5", which was the name used for the aircraft that crashed in the original Cyborg novel.

In the opening sequence, a narrator (series producer Harve Bennett) identifies the protagonist, "Steve Austin, astronaut. A man barely alive." Richard Anderson, in character as Oscar Goldman, then intones off-camera, "Gentlemen, we can rebuild him. We have the technology. We have the capability to make the world's first bionic man. Steve Austin will be that man. Better than he was before. Better...stronger...faster." During the first season, beginning with "Population: Zero", Anderson, as Goldman, intoned more simply, "We can rebuild him. We have the technology. We can make him better than he was. Better...stronger...faster." During the operation, when he is having his bionics fitted, a list of items and numbers is displayed and lists his power plant as "atomic".

Theme music
The opening and closing credits of the Wine, Women & War and The Solid Gold Kidnapping telefilms used a theme song written by Glen A. Larson, and sung by Dusty Springfield, backed by Ron "Escalade" Piscina. This song was also used in the initial promotion of the series.

However, when the weekly series began, the song was replaced by an instrumental theme by Oliver Nelson. The first regular episode, "Population: Zero", introduced a new element to the opening sequence: a voiceover by Oscar Goldman stating the rationale behind creating a bionic man. The first season narration was shorter than that used in the second and subsequent seasons.

Steve Austin's bionics

To maintain the show's plausibility, producer Kenneth Johnson set very specific limits on Steve Austin's abilities. He elaborated, "When you're dealing with the area of fantasy, if you say, 'Well, they're bionic so they can do whatever they want,' then it gets out of hand, so you've got to have really, really tight rules. [Steve and Jaime] can jump up two stories but not three. They can jump down three stories but not four."

Austin's superhuman enhancements are:

 A bionic left eye:
 It has a 20.2:1 zoom lens along with a night vision function (as well as the restoration of normal vision). The figure of 20.2:1 is taken from the faux computer graphics in the opening credits; the figure 20:1 is mentioned twice in the series, in the episode "Population: Zero" and "Secret of Bigfoot". Austin's bionic eye also has other features, such as an infrared filter used frequently to see in the dark and also to detect heat (as in the episode "The Pioneers"), and the ability to view humanoid beings moving too fast for a normal eye to see (as in the story arc "The Secret of Bigfoot"). One early episode shows the eye as a deadly accurate targeting device for his throwing arm.
 In Caidin's original novels, Austin's eye was depicted as simply a camera (which had to be physically removed after use) and Austin remained blind in the eye. Later, Austin gained the ability to shoot a laser from the eye. The Charlton Comics comic book spin-off from the series also established that Austin's bionic eye could shoot a laser beam (as demonstrated in the first issues of the color comic), but neither function was shown on television.

 Bionic legs:
 These allow him to run at tremendous speed and make great leaps. A faster top speed is possible, as an episode of the Bionic Woman spin-off entitled "Winning Is Everything" shows female cyborg Jaime Sommers outrunning a race car going . In the later TV movies, Austin is shown leaping what clearly appears to be heights far in excess of this.
 A bionic right arm:
 It has the equivalent strength of a bulldozer; that the arm contains a Geiger counter was established in "Doomsday and Counting", the sixth episode of the first season.

The implants have a major flaw in that extreme cold interferes with their functions and can disable them given sufficient exposure. However, when Austin returns to a warmer temperature, the implants quickly regain full functionality. The first season also established that Austin's bionics malfunction in the micro-gravity of space, though Austin's bionics are later modified to rectify this. The bionic eye is vulnerable to ultrasonic attack, resulting in blindness and dizziness. It is not explained how Austin's organic body is able to withstand the stress of either bionic hardware weight or performance of superhuman feats.

To indicate to viewers that Austin was using his bionic enhancements, sequences with him performing superhuman tasks were presented in slow-motion and accompanied by an electronic "dit dit dit dit" sound effect. (This characteristic sound effect was actually first used in season 1 episode 4, "Day of the Robot", not during use of Austin's bionics but with the robotic clone of Major Fred Sloan, played by actor John Saxon, during the final fight scene.) When the bionic eye was used, the camera zoomed in on Austin's face, followed by an extreme close-up of his eye; his point of view usually included a crosshair motif accompanied by a beeping sound-effect. In early episodes, different ways of presenting Austin's powers were tested, including a heartbeat sound effect that predated the electronic sound, and in the three original made-for-TV movies, no sound effects or slow-motion were used, with Austin's actions shown at normal speed (except for his running, which used trick photography); the slow-motion portrayal was introduced with the first hour-long episode, "Population: Zero."

Episodes

The series consists of three TV-movies, five seasons of episodes, and three more TV-movies.

Novels
Martin Caidin wrote four novels featuring his original version of Steve Austin beginning in 1972 with Cyborg. Although several other writers such as Mike Jahn later wrote a number of novelizations based upon the TV series, in most cases these writers chose to base their character upon the literary version of Austin rather than the TV show version. As a result, several of the novelizations have entire scenes and in one case an ending that differed from the original episodes, as the cold-blooded killer of Caidin's novels handled things somewhat differently from his non-killing TV counterpart. For example, the Jahn book International Incidents, an adaptation of the episode "Love Song for Tanya", ends with Austin using the poison dart gun in his bionic hand to kill an enemy agent; since the TV version of the character lacked this weapon, the villain was simply captured in the episode as broadcast.

Original novels
(all by Martin Caidin)
 Cyborg (1972)
 Operation Nuke (1973)
 High Crystal (1974)
 Cyborg IV (1975)

(Of the above, only Cyborg was adapted for television.)

Novelizations
 Wine, Women and War – Mike Jahn
 Solid Gold Kidnapping – Evan Richards
 Pilot Error – Jay Barbree
 The Rescue of Athena One – Jahn
 The Secret of Bigfoot Pass (UK title, The Secret of Bigfoot) – Jahn
 International Incidents – Jahn (this volume adapted several episodes into one interconnected storyline)

Other adaptations

Comics
Charlton Comics published both a color comic book and a black and white, illustrated magazine, featuring original adventures as well as differing adaptations of the original TV movie. While the comic book was closely based upon the series, and geared toward a young audience, the magazine was darker and more violent and seemed to be based more upon the literary version of the character, aimed at adult readers. Both magazines were cancelled around the same time the TV series ended. Artists Howard Chaykin and Neal Adams were frequent contributors to both publications. Steve Kahn, who had previously published magazines on the Beatles and the teen fan magazine FLiP, worked with MCA and Charlton in overseeing and publishing these books.

A British comic strip version was also produced, written by Angus P. Allan, drawn by Martin Asbury and printed in TV comic Look-In. A series of standalone comic strips was printed on the packaging of a series of model kits by Fundimensions based upon the series. In Colombia, a black and white comic book series was published in the late 70s, with art and stories by Jorge Peña. This series was licensed by Universal studios to Greco (Grupo Editorial Colombiano), then known as Editora Cinco, now part of Grupo Editorial Televisa. In France, Télé-Junior, a magazine devoted to comic book adaptations of all sorts of TV series and cartoons also featured a Six Million Dollar Man comic (under its French title, L'Homme qui valait trois milliards, i.e. The Three Billion Dollar Man) with art by Pierre Le Goff and stories by P. Tabet and Bodis. A tradepaperback reprinting several episodes from the magazine was released in October, 1980.

In 1996, a new comic book series entitled Bionix was announced, to be published by Maximum Press. The comic was to have been an updated version of both the Six Million Dollar Man and the Bionic Woman and feature new renditions of the two characters. Although the magazine was advertised in comic book trade publications, it was ultimately never published.

On August 24, 2011, Dynamite Comics published the first issue of The Bionic Man, an adaptation written by Kevin Smith based upon a screenplay he'd written for a never-produced 1990s motion picture version of The Six Million Dollar Man. After concluding the adaptation in the spring of 2012 the comic series moved on to original stories, as well as a re-imagining of the original TV series' Secret of Bigfoot storyline. A spin-off comic re-imagining The Bionic Woman followed a few months later, and in January 2013 Dynamite launched a crossover mini-series, The Bionic Man vs. The Bionic Woman. The artwork in these series, covers and interiors, varies between Austin being rendered in the likeness of Lee Majors and not. As 2014 began, Dynamite discontinued its reboot titles and replaced them with a new ongoing series, The Six Million Dollar Man Season 6, continuing the adventures of Austin from the conclusion of the 1977–78 season and featuring not only the likeness of Lee Majors, but also other recurring actors such as Richard Anderson, as well as Darren McGavin as Oliver Spencer from the first TV movie. Jaime Sommers was reintroduced from issue 3, with a spin-off comic series, The Bionic Woman Season 4, announced in June 2014 with a scheduled launch in the fall of 2014.

Audiobooks
Peter Pan Records and its sister company Power Records published several record albums featuring original dramatized stories (including an adaptation of the pilot film), several of which were also adapted as comic books designed to be read along with the recording. Three albums' worth of stories were released, one of which featured Christmas-themed stories. Individual stories were also released in other formats, including  singles.

Film
Universal Pictures developed a screenplay in 1995 with Kevin Smith, but the outing never materialized. In December 2001, it was announced that Universal had pacted with Dimension Films on the project after Dimension president Bob Weinstein saw its potential as a franchise. Universal retained film rights to the original TV show, while Dimension purchased the rights to the Cyborg novel, as well as Caidin's three other novels in the series: Operation Nuke, High Crystal and Cyborg IV. Larry Gordon and Scott Faye were going to produce with Paul Rosenberg's Collision Entertainment. Smith's screenplay was later adapted for The Bionic Man, an ongoing comic book series launched in 2011 by Dynamite Comics.

In October 2002, Trevor Sands was hired to write a new screenplay, titled The Six Billion Dollar Man, but Dimension scrapped it when actor Jim Carrey pitched a comedic take on the material for him to star in, with Scot Armstrong as writer and Todd Phillips as director/co-writer. Filming was expected to begin in 2004.

In a July 2006 interview at Comic Con, Richard Anderson (who played Oscar Goldman in the series) stated that he was involved with producing a movie of the series, but the rights were at the time in litigation between Miramax and Universal.

On November 6, 2014, it was announced that a feature film, tentatively titled The Six Billion Dollar Man, would go into production. Mark Wahlberg was set to play Colonel Steve Austin, with Peter Berg as director. Filming was to begin in early 2015, for a theatrical release the following year. On November 2, 2015 it was reported that Berg had left the film and had been replaced by Damian Szifron, who will also write the film. Filming was to begin in September 2016 with a December 22, 2017 release date.

In December 2017, The Weinstein Company sold the film's rights to Warner Bros. As of January 2018, they hoped to start filming the movie in mid 2018. In April 2018, they set an early to mid 2019 release for the film. The film was moved to June 5, 2020 until Wonder Woman 1984 took over the release date, and in April 2019, Travis Knight and Bill Dubuque replaced Szifron as director and writer.

Cultural influence
In Brazil, under the military dictatorship, some important government officials, previously elected by direct suffrage, were appointed by the president, or elected indirectly, out of a shortlist picked by the president. These politicians were called "bionic" (biônicos), due to the series' popularity, and the association with the perceived extraordinary power and influence held by the appointed officials. Between 1964 and 1985, Brazil came to have "bionic" senators, governors and mayors. With the 1988 Constitution of Brazil, all "bionic" appointments were abolished.

In Israel, the series was retitled The Man Worth Millions since "six million" evoked memories of The Holocaust; specifically the most commonly quoted estimate of the number of Jewish victims.

Award
In 2003, Lee Majors won TV Land's "Superest Superhero" award.

Home media
Universal Playback released the first two seasons of The Six Million Dollar Man on DVD in Region 2 and Region 4 in 2005–2006. The first three seasons were also released on the Italian market (Region 2) in late 2008. The season 1 release also features the three pilot movies that preceded the weekly series.

The Region 1 (North American) release, along with that of The Bionic Woman was one of the most eagerly awaited; its release had been withheld for many years due to copyright issues regarding the original novel. In fact, with the exception of a few episodes released in the DiscoVision format in the early 1980s and a single VHS release of the two-part The Bionic Woman storyline that same decade, the series as a whole had never been released in North America in any home video format.

On July 21, 2010 however, Time Life (under license from Universal) announced the release of a complete series box set of The Six Million Dollar Man on DVD in Region 1 for the first time on November 23, 2010. The 40-disc set features all 99 episodes of the series as well as the three pilot films and the three reunion TV-movies which also feature Jaime Sommers, along with several episodes of The Bionic Woman that were part of inter-series crossovers (i.e. part one aired on one series, and part two on another) in order to include complete storylines. In addition, the set features extensive bonus features including interviews and featurettes with all major cast members and the set comes encased in collectible packaging that includes a sound chip, activated when the box is opened, that plays back part of the first season opening credits dialogue. The release is available directly through Time-Life's "6mdm" website as well a through several third-party on-line vendors.

In November 2011, Universal Pictures began releasing individual season sets of the series on DVD, available in retail stores. It has subsequently released all five seasons.  The fifth and final season was released on February 18, 2014.

Several episodes of The Six Million Dollar Man actually saw their North American DVD debut several weeks in advance of the box set, as Universal Home Video included the three "crossover" episodes that helped launch The Bionic Woman as bonuses on the October 19, 2010 DVD release of Season 1 of The Bionic Woman.

On October 13, 2015, Universal Pictures released a retail version of The Six Million Dollar Man- The Complete Series on DVD in Region 1.

In Region 2, Fabulous Films acquired the rights to the series in 2012 and subsequently released seasons 3–5 on DVD on October 1, 2012.  It also re-released the first two seasons on February 25, 2013.  A 40-disc complete series boxset was released on April 2, 2012.

On May 2, 2022, Shout Factory announced the complete series is scheduled to be released on Blu-ray July 12, 2022. It will also feature crossover episodes and six films.

See also

 A Man Called Sloane (cyborg character Torque)
 Inspector Gadget (franchise)
 Jake 2.0
 Now and Again
 RoboCop
 Max Steel
 Deus Ex: Human Revolution
 M.A.C.H. 1

Footnotes

References

External links

  (original pilot)
  (series)

1970s American science fiction television series
1970s toys
1973 American television series debuts
1978 American television series endings
ABC Movie of the Week
American action television series
American Broadcasting Company original programming
American superhero television series
Bionic franchise
Brain–computer interfacing in fiction
Charlton Comics titles
Cyborgs in television
English-language television shows
Espionage television series
Science fiction franchises
Television series by Universal Television
Television shows adapted into comics
Television shows based on American novels
Television series about astronauts